François-Etienne Dulci, O.P. (died 23 June 1624) was a Roman Catholic prelate who served as Archbishop of Avignon (1609–1624).

Biography
François-Etienne Dulci was ordained a priest in the Order of Preachers.
On 6 April 1609, he was appointed during the papacy of Pope Paul V as Archbishop of Avignon.
On 26 April 1609, he was consecrated bishop by Girolamo Bernerio, Cardinal-Bishop of Porto e Santa Rufina, with Giovanni Battista del Tufo, Bishop Emeritus of Acerra, and Marcantonio Genovesi, Bishop of Montemarano, serving as co-consecrators. He was officially installed sometime in 2010. 
He served as Archbishop of Avignon until his death on 23 June 1624.

References 

17th-century Roman Catholic archbishops in France
Bishops appointed by Pope Paul V
1624 deaths
Dominican bishops
Archbishops of Avignon